Sana is a rural commune in the Cercle of Macina in the Ségou Region of Mali. The commune covers an area of about 500 square kilometers and includes 27 villages. In the 2009 census the commune had a population of 28,356.  The administrative center of the commune is the village of Saye.

References

External links
.

Communes of Ségou Region